Sun City Girls were an American experimental rock band, formed in 1979 in Phoenix, Arizona. From 1981, the group consisted of Alan Bishop (bass guitar, vocals), his brother Richard Bishop (guitar, piano, vocals), and Charles Gocher (drums, vocals). Their name was inspired by Sun City, Arizona, an Arizona retirement community. In 2007, Gocher died following a long battle with cancer, bringing an end to the group. In a 26-year career, they produced 50 albums, 23 cassettes, 6 feature-length videos, and many other recordings.

Operating in indie rock and underground music circles, Sun City Girls recorded numerous critically acclaimed albums, released in small editions by labels like Placebo, Majora, Eclipse Records, Amarillo Records, and their own Abduction Records, and has garnered a devoted cult following. Their music was hugely eclectic and varied, spreading across genres such as spoken word, free improvisation, jazz and rock, along with a recurring interest in world music. Their records typically incorporated lyrics that rely heavily on their interests in mysticism, paranormal topics (especially UFOs), religious cults and other esoterica, often also manifested in their song titles, lyrics and album art. Performances by the group were often wildly unpredictable, sometimes verging on performance art, with elaborate costumes, kabuki-inspired makeup, and the creation of a festive, ritualistic atmosphere with audience participation.

Critic Steve Leggett writes, "Throughout its history SCG has remained a challenging, unpredictable, and eclectic musical unit, operating outside the commercially driven aspirations of the mainstream recording industry, and the group has become somewhat of a beacon to independent musicians and artists everywhere." Writing in the Village Voice, Ted Hendrickson argues, "They've never made any sense, conventionally speaking, and that's what makes them them."

History
As children in Michigan, Richard and Alan Bishop took childhood musical inspiration from their grandfather, who was a Lebanese oud player. According to Richard,His house also doubled as a meeting place for his fellow lodge members who were well versed in the Knights Templar doctrine and the Egyptian Rites of Memphis and Mithrais. They didn't buy into the "Christianization of Freemasonry" which took place at the "official" temples around town, so they met on their own on a regular basis. They still believed in the ways of the old country. There was a weird "Arabian Nights" type of magic in that house, both light and dark. My most vivid childhood dreams and experiences took place there and they were dark indeed. By the age of 10, I had an entire pantheon of different spirits catalogued in my head. But nothing about it was disturbing, it was just the way it was. It's very hard to relate what the atmosphere was all about unless one has experienced similar surroundings, but suffice it to say, I couldn't have asked for a better environment.
The band originated in the Arizona punk rock scene which included Meat Puppets, JFA and The Feederz, Sun City Girls quickly began to incorporate lengthy improvisations, beat poetry, surf music, jazz, tape music, and elements of South Asian, South American, Middle Eastern and African music.

Until the late 1980s, most of the band's releases were issued on audio cassettes, which gained legendary status among cassette culture enthusiasts. But a shift to the LP format had already begun with seminal records such as Sun City Girls (1984), Grotto of Miracles (1986), Torch of the Mystics (1990), Dawn of the Devi (1991), Bright Surroundings Dark Beginnings (1993), and Kaliflower (1994). Dante's Disneyland Inferno and 330,003 Crossdressers From Beyond the Rig Veda, both double-CDs released in 1996, were perhaps the pinnacle of the band's aesthetic. Frequent SCG collaborators included violinist Eyvind Kang and sound engineer Scott Colburn.

, the band's remaining members reside in Seattle, Washington. Alan Bishop heads the label Sublime Frequencies and performs and releases records under the names Alvarius B and Uncle Jim. In the early 1980s, he was in the short-lived band Paris 1942, with Maureen Tucker from the Velvet Underground. In 2005, he edited a compilation titled Crime and Dissonance of Ennio Morricone's late 1960s and early 1970s soundtrack work. Rick Bishop performs as a solo guitarist under the name Sir Richard Bishop. Charles Gocher released a solo CD called Pint Sized Spartacus in 1997, and performed with a number of groups, including the Master Musicians of Bukkake, Tripod, and the New Session People.

After Gocher's death, Alan and Rick Bishop announced that they would no longer perform, nor record music using the Sun City Girls name. However, they do plan to release existing archival Sun City Girls recordings as time permits.

Discography
Note: The cassettes released by Cloaven c. 1987–1990 are listed in the order they were released.  The dates of the recordings appear after the album titles.

Studio albums
 Sun City Girls LP (Placebo) 1984
 Grotto of Miracles LP (Placebo) 1986
 Horse Cock Phepner (Placebo) LP/CS 1987
 Torch of the Mystics LP (Majora) 1990, CD reissue (Tupelo) 1993
 Dawn of the Devi LP (Majora) 1991
 Valentines From Matahari LP (Majora) 1993, CD reissue (Majora) 1998
 Kaliflower CD/LP (Abduction) 1993
 Jacks Creek LP (Abduction) 1994
 Dante's Disneyland Inferno 2-CD (Abduction) 1996, 3-LP reissue (Locust) 2002
 330,003 Crossdressers From Beyond the Rig Veda 2-CD (Abduction) 1996, 3-LP reissue (Locust) 2001
 Funeral Mariachi LP/CD (Abduction) 2010
Soundtrack albums
 Juggernaut LP (Abduction) 1994
 Piasa...Devourer of Men LP (Abduction) 1994
 Dulce LP (Abduction) 1998
 Mister Lonely: Music From A Film By Harmony Korine with J. Spaceman LP/CD (Drag City) 2008
Compilation albums
 Box of Chameleons 3-CD box (Abduction) 1997
 Singles Volume 1 CD (Abduction) 2008
 Singles Volume 2 CD (Abduction) 2009
 Singles Volume 3 CD (Abduction) 2013
7-inch singles
 And So The Dead Tongue Sang (Pulp) 1987
 You're Never Alone With a Cigarette (Majora) 1990
 Three Fake Female Orgasms 2×7″ (Majora) 1991
 Let's Just Lounge (Majora) 1992
 Napoleon and Josephine (Scratch) 1992
 Caroliner tribute (Nuf Sed) 1992 [split with Thinking Fellers Union Local 282]
 Eye Mohini (Majora) 1992
 Borungku Si Derita double 7-inch (Majora) 1993 [also issued as a single 7-inch]
 Live...For Chilly (bootleg) 1993
 Carl the Barber 2003 [split 7-inch with Carl Wellman]
 Uncle Jim's True Confessions of Homeland Security (Empirical) 2003

 Live albums
 Live from Planet Boomerang 2-LP (Majora) 1992
 Live at C.O.N. Artists LP (Poon Village) 1993
 Bright Surroundings Dark Beginnings LP (Majora) 1993, CD reissue (Majora) 1998
 Live from the Land of the Rising Sun City Girls CD (Japan Overseas) 1997
 Cameo Demons and Their Manifestations CD (Abduction) 2000 – CFR vol. 1
 The Dreamy Draw CD (Abduction) 2000 – CFR vol. 2
 Superculto CD (Abduction) 2000 – CFR vol. 3
 A Bullet Through the Last Temple CD (Abduction) 2000 – CFR vol. 4
 Severed Finger With a Wedding Ring CD (Abduction) 2000 – CFR vol. 5
 Sumatran Electric Chair CD (Abduction) 2001 – CFR vol. 6
 Libyan Dream CD reissue (Abduction) 2001 – CFR vol. 7
 The Handsome Stranger CD (Abduction) 2001 – CFR vol. 8
 High Asia/Lo Pacific 2-CD reissue (Abduction) 2001 – CFR vols. 9 & 10
 Wah CD (Abduction) 2002
 Flute and Mask CD (Abduction) 2002
 God is My Solar System/Superpower 2-LP reissue (Eclipse) 2003
 Bleach Has Feelings, Too!/To Cover Up Your Right To Live 2-LP reissue (Eclipse) 2003
 Carnival Folklore Resurrection Radio 2-CD (Abduction) 2004 – CFR vols. 11 & 12
 The Fresh Kill of a Cape Hunting Dog / Def In Italy 2-LP reissue (Eclipse) 2004
 98.6 IS DEATH CD (Abduction) 2004 – CFR vol. 13
 Folk Songs of the Rich and Evil / Exotica on $5 a Day 2-LP reissue (Eclipse) 2005
 Uncle Jim's Superstars of Greenwich Meantime LP (Black Velvet Fuckere Records) 2005
 Static from the Outside Set CD (Abduction) 2006 – CFR vol. 14
 Uncle Jim's Superstars of Greenwich Meantime CD reissue (Abduction) 2006
 Live Room CD (Three Lobed) 2006
 Montreal Pop CD
 Djinn Funnel LP (Nashazphone) 2006
 Piano Bar LP (Ri Be Xibalba) 2006
 For Drummers Only LP (Ri Be Xibalba) 2006
 Beginnings Dark LP (Enterruption) 2007
 Live at the Sky Church – September 3rd, 2004 LP & DVD (Twenty One Eighty Two Recording Company) 2020
Cassettes
 Midnight Cowboys from Ipanema CS (Breakfast Without Meat) 1986, LP/CD reissue (Amarillo Records) 1994
 God is My Solar System 1982 CS (Cloaven) 1987
 Superpower 1982–83 CS (Cloaven) 1987
 Hatchet Rain 1983 CS (Cloaven) 1987
 Bleach Has Feelings, Too! 1983–85 CS (Cloaven) 1987
 To Cover Up Your Right To Live 1983–85 CS (Cloaven) 1987
 Def in Italy 1984 CS (Cloaven) 1987
 Folk Songs of The Rich and Evil 1985 CS (Cloaven) 1987
 Fresh Kill of a Cape Hunting Dog 1985–86 CS (Cloaven) 1987
 Exotica on Five Dollars a Day 1986 CS (Cloaven) 1987
 Fruit of The Womb 1986 CS (Cloaven) 1987
 Polite Deception 1986 CS (Cloaven) 1987
 Famous Asthma 1986–87 CS (Cloaven) 1987
 The Palm Leaves of Victory 1986–87 CS (Cloaven) 1987
 Cloaven Theatre No. 1 1987 CS (Cloaven) 1987
 Cloaven Theatre No. 2 1987 CS (Cloaven) 1987
 Tibetan Jazz 666 1987 CS (Cloaven) 1987
 The Multiple Hallucinations of an Assassin 1987–88 CS (Cloaven) 1989
 Cloaven Theatre No. 3 1988 CS (Cloaven) 1989
 Audio Letter to Mitch Meyers 1988 CS (Cloaven) 1989
 That Old Western Sieve 1988 CS (Cloaven) 1989
 Graverobbing in the Future 1988 CS (Cloaven) 1989
 Extra-Sensory Defection CS (Cloaven) 1989
 The Great North American Tricksters CS (Cloaven) 1990
 Pelican 92 CS (Abduction) 1993

References

External links
 Trouser Press article on the Sun City Girls
 Sun City Girls Official Website
 Sweet Pea correspondence with Alan Bishop
 In memoriam Charles Gocher
 last recording of Sun City Girl in Berlin at CTM-festival

Rock music groups from Arizona
American experimental rock groups
Masked musicians
Musical groups from Phoenix, Arizona
Drag City (record label) artists
Cassette culture 1970s–1990s
Locust Music artists
Sibling musical groups